Jesse Tamunobaraboye Sekidika (born 14 July 1996) is a Nigerian footballer who plays as a winger for Ümraniyespor, on loan from Eyüpspor.

Early career

United Kingdom
Born in Nigerian metropolis Port Harcourt, Sekidika was first scouted in England while playing as winger at Leicestershire-based private boarding school Brooke House College. After impressing there, he trialed at Stoke City at the 2013 Keele Cup and caught the attention of Manchester United scouts who invited him to train at their Carrington training ground. However, due to the stringent requirement of a British work permit and not having a European Passport, Jesse could not be offered a contract at Stoke City or Manchester United.

Portugal
In August 2014, Sekidika left UK and moved to Portugal where he joined the youth team of Oeiras, located in the suburb of the same name of the capital Lisbon, which has been a traditional feeder for the country´s bigger teams. At Oeiras, he played the first half of 2014–15 season. By then, he had already been invited to take part of the gatherings and training sessions of the Flying Eagles, the Nigeria national under-20 football team. During last days of the 2014–15 winter-break, he signed with Benfica's youth team. He was part of the Benfica squad that played in the 2014–15 UEFA Youth League in which Benfica reached the quarter-finals. At league level, he made six appearances and scored once for Benfica in the second-half of the 2014–15 First Portuguese youth league.

Club career

Napredak Kruševac
In June 2015, his contract with Benfica expired. However, in the winter break of the 2015–16 season, along with Bohdan Sichkaruk, he joined FK Napredak Kruševac who sought to confirm their second-level title and return to top-flight status. This endeavor left Sekidika mostly off the field. The coach chose to stick with the starting eleven that was giving him good results. Sekidika played the 6 last rounds of the 2015–16 Serbian First League season, scoring in all but one and helped them to a dominant finish as champion and gain promotion to the Serbian top-flight, the SuperLiga.

Inconsistencies at management positions and an uncertain starting line-up, left Napredak end 2016–17 Serbian SuperLiga season in 6th place. Sekidika failed to score that season. After a weak start under Nenad Sakić, in September brought in Milorad Kosanović who made Sekidika a regular in the line up. Napredak finished the season in 7th. Sekidika appeared in 28 games, racking up 3 goals.

In July 2018, Napredak participated in a summer tournament in Portugal where it played against S.L. Benfica. Napredak lost 3–0 in a game played on July 10. Portuguese media put the focus on Sekidika as a former Benfica player and how he had played against several former teammates. Kosanović convinced the board to sell Sekidika and replace him with domestic players he had coached in previous clubs.

Eskişehirspor
Sekidika moved to Turkey and signed with Eskişehirspor for a symbolic amount.

Galatasaray
In January 2020 he signed with Süper Lig side Galatasaray. Sekidika trained hard and played in a friendly against Altay. After the friendly match Sekidika stated that "this is just beginning and I am so excited to play such a great football club".

His contract was terminated by Galatasaray on 15 August 2022.

Konyaspor
He moved to Konyaspor on loan until the end of the 20-21 Season on 29 January 2021.

OH Leuven
On 27 August 2021, Galatasaray announced that the 25-year-old football player was loaned to Oud-Heverlee Leuven, one of the Belgian First Division A teams, until the end of the season.

Eyüpspor

On 1 February 2022, Sekidika was loaned out to 1.Lig club Eyüpspor, until the end of the season.

Career statistics

Club

Honours
Napredak Kruševac
Serbian First League: 2015–16

References

External links
 
 
 Jesse Sekdika profile at FK Napredak Kruševac official website 

1996 births
Living people
Sportspeople from Port Harcourt
Association football wingers
Nigerian footballers
Galatasaray S.K. footballers
Eskişehirspor footballers
FK Napredak Kruševac players
Konyaspor footballers
Oud-Heverlee Leuven players
Eyüpspor footballers
Ümraniyespor footballers
Süper Lig players
TFF First League players
Belgian Pro League players
Serbian First League players
Serbian SuperLiga players
Nigerian expatriate footballers
Nigerian expatriate sportspeople in England
Expatriate footballers in England
Nigerian expatriate sportspeople in Portugal
Expatriate footballers in Portugal
Nigerian expatriate sportspeople in Serbia
Expatriate footballers in Serbia
Nigerian expatriate sportspeople in Turkey
Expatriate footballers in Turkey
Nigerian expatriate sportspeople in Belgium
Expatriate footballers in Belgium